Mark Trevorrow (born 4 February 1959 in Melbourne, Victoria) is an Australian comedian, television host and media personality.  In the early 1980s he had two Top 20 hits as part of Globos with Wendy De Waal, and in 1984 he debuted "Bob Downe", who went on to become his best-known character. After being very successful at the Edinburgh Festival Fringe in 1987, Trevorrow split his time touring between England and Australia.  He has appeared extensively on television, released four albums, and written a book.

Early life 
He was raised in the Melbourne suburb of Murrumbeena, the third son of Alan, a builder-turned-teacher, and his wife Dorothy. He has a younger sister and two older brothers. In his teens, he came out to his family as gay. He attended Murrumbeena High School and was co-editor of the school magazine.  That interest in journalism led him to become a copy boy at The Sun News-Pictorial starting at age 17, for five years.  He moved on to theatre and cabaret, encouraged by the party atmosphere at the Melbourne production of The Rocky Horror Show every weekend.

Career
Trevorrow first came to prominence in the cabaret duo Globos with Wendy De Waal, and they scored two Australian Top 20 hits with quirky covers of "Tintarella di luna" (1982) and Sonny & Cher's "The Beat Goes On" (1983), both of which were produced by Red Symons.

In 1984 he formed a comedy duo in with Cathy Armstrong, in which his flamboyant alter ego Bob Downe was born. "Bob Downe" is a cheesy, safari-suit-wearing lounge singer with dazzling teeth, and host of the fictional regional daytime TV show Good Morning Murwillumbah. The distinction between the two personae is often blurred: Trevorrow and the "Prince of Polyester" both appear at events and host television programs.

In January 1987, Trevorrow went solo with the character at Sydney's Harold Park Hotel. In 1988 he took Bob Downe to the Edinburgh Festival Fringe, where he was a huge and instant success. Bob Downe played throughout the 1990s to ever-larger British audiences, with Trevorrow in perpetual commute between London and Sydney, touring nationally in both countries. With a multitude of UK TV credits under his beige belt, Bob Downe made his twelfth Edinburgh Fringe appearance in 2002.

Back in Australia, the first Bob Downe album, Greatest Hits, was released in Australia in 1996, with 1997's Jazzy! nominated for a Best Comedy Album ARIA music award. 1998 saw the Australian publication of his first book, All Bob Downe! (Penguin) and he hosted the Sydney Gay and Lesbian Mardi Gras Parade broadcast for Network Ten. In 1999 and 2000, Bob Downe again hosted the Mardi Gras Parade, a consistent ratings winner for Network Ten, and also won the Cabaret Artiste of the Year at the Green Room Awards in Melbourne. He released his third album, Huge Hits, in 2001. His comedy/chat series, The Bob Downe Show (Foxtel/TV1), went to air in December 2000. Bob Downe's last three national theatre tours, Million Sellers (1999), Whiter! Brighter! (2000) and Cold August Night (2002) were sellouts everywhere, including the Sydney Opera House and the State Theatre.

In 2001, Trevorrow made his first appearance as himself rather than his alter ego, opening a new show at the Black Cat cabaret in Melbourne. The show also appeared at the Sydney Opera House Studio in 2003, followed by a studio album It's About Time in 2004 (ABC Music/Universal). Trevorrow has appeared on the Australian series of Good News Week, often joining with host Paul McDermott in a sing-along of an Australian song at the end of the episode. He has collaborated several times with the Doug Anthony All Stars (which included McDermott), appearing in their TV series, DAAS Kapital, and their film The Edinburgh Years. He has also featured in episodes of the sitcom Kath & Kim, as well as hosting the series The Way We Were, and has appeared in the animated Australian/Canadian sitcom, Quads! as the voice of Spalding (SBS 2002). Trevorrow is a regular fill-in presenter on the "Evening Show" on 702 ABC Sydney. He has also been a contestant on the special Australia's Brainiest Comedian.

Bob Downe Discography

Albums

Singles

Awards and nominations

ARIA Music Awards
The ARIA Music Awards are a set of annual ceremonies presented by Australian Recording Industry Association (ARIA), which recognise excellence, innovation, and achievement across all genres of the music of Australia. They commenced in 1987.

! 
|-
| 1997 || Jazzy! || ARIA Award for Best Comedy Release ||  || 
|-

Filmography

Books

References

External links
 Official website
 

1959 births
Living people
Australian male comedians
Australian television personalities
Comedians from Melbourne
Gay comedians
Australian gay men
Australian LGBT broadcasters
People from the Northern Rivers
People from Murrumbeena, Victoria
Australian LGBT comedians